Jose Ma. Clemente "Joey" Sarte Salceda (born October 26, 1961) is a Filipino statesman and the current Representative of Albay's 2nd District in the Philippine House of Representatives. He previously served as governor of Albay province in the Philippines for three terms. Prior to that, he was a three-year term representative of the Third District of Albay and was appointed as Presidential Chief of Staff on February 10, 2007, after the resignation of Michael Defensor, before he himself resigned on March 29, 2007, to pursue his gubernatorial bid in his province. Salceda has also been chairman of the powerful House Committee on Ways and Means since 2019. Salceda is the principal author of the Tax Reform for Acceleration and Inclusion Law, the Corporate Recovery and Tax Incentives for Enterprises (CREATE) Law, which reduced corporate income taxes in the Philippines to 20%, and the Free College Tuition Law.

Biography

Personal life
Joey Salceda is the son of former Polangui, Albay Mayor Jesus Salceda, Sr. Salceda graduated cum laude with a Bachelor of Science in Management Engineering from the Ateneo de Manila University in 1982 (1981 in some sources) and received his master's degree in Business Management at the Asian Institute of Management.  At the Ateneo de Manila University, former President Gloria Macapagal Arroyo was his economics professor, and another former president, Benigno Aquino III, was his classmate.

Before joining the legislature, Salceda was the Research Director of UBS Warburg (a division of Swiss Bank Corporation). While with UBS, he was voted among the top five analysts in a 1996 survey of Philippine fund managers. He also served as Research Director of Barings Securities Phils. (now ING Group) for five years. During his term, the Barings research team was voted number one in 12 international surveys of fund managers. He also garnered several awards for his distinguished performance in the field of financial markets research. He was voted by foreign fund managers in Asiamoney's Annual Survey as "Best Analyst" in 1995 and "Best Economist" for four consecutive years from 1993 to 1996. 

Prior to his career in the private sector, Salceda was also Congressional Fellow to the late Speaker Ramon Mitra and Chief of Staff to the late Senator Raul Roco.

Representative of the 3rd district of Albay (1998-2007)

Salceda was elected chairman of the House Committee on Trade and Industry, a rare feat for a freshman legislator. During his chairmanship, he led the enactment three key trade measures, namely Republic Act No. 8751 or the Countervailing Duty Act, Republic Act No. 8752 or the Anti-Dumping Duty Act, and Republic Act No. 8800 or the Safeguard Measures Act. 

Salceda is also regarded as the "Founding Father of Ligao City" after his successful sponsorship of the measure converting the municipality of Ligao into a component city under Republic Act No. 9008.

In recognition of his experience in the markets, he held several key positions during his freshman term, including as Chairman of the Committee on Trade and Industry and vice chair of the Committees on Ways and Means and Economic Affairs. 

Salceda was also instrumental in initiating the Bicol International Airport, which he requested from President Arroyo in 2004.

Governor of Albay (2007-2016) 
After resigning from the Arroyo Cabinet in 2007, Salceda ran for Governor of Albay and was subsequently elected, defeating incumbent Fernando V. Gonzalez. His three terms as governor were best known for his establishment of the zero-casualty doctrine in disaster preparedness for which he earned international recognition as a Senior Global Champion for disaster risk reduction by the United Nations as well as his climate change advocacy, which eventually led to him being elected as the first Asian co-chair of the United Nations Green Climate Fund in 2013. Salceda also received numerous awards in disaster resilience, good governance, education, health, and tourism.

Salceda also worked for economic and tourism development across the Bicol region as Chair of the Regional Development Council (RDC) of Bicol for three consecutive terms. As RDC Chairman, Salceda established the AlMaSor regional tourism alliance, with Albay, Masbate, and Sorsogon as its constituent provinces. Salceda was also instrumental in the establishment of the Bicol University College of Medicine.

Representative of the 2nd district of Albay (2016-) 
After three terms as Governor, Salceda returned to Congress as Representative of the 2nd district of Albay in 2016, where he is credited for articulating the economic strategy "Dutertenomics" as well as for championing the Tax Reform for Acceleration and Inclusion or TRAIN law. Salceda, as principal author, also defended the Free College Tuition law from its critics in Cabinet, who sought its veto.

In his second term, Salceda was elected as Chairman of the House Committee on Ways and Means, the tax committee of the House of Representatives, and was reelected to head the committee in 2022.

As Chairman of the House's tax committee, Salceda led the enactment of the CREATE law, the POGO tax regime, and the tax regime for proprietary schools.

References

1961 births
Living people
Governors of Albay
Ateneo de Manila University alumni
Aksyon Demokratiko politicians
20th-century Filipino economists
Bicolano politicians
Members of the House of Representatives of the Philippines from Albay
Presidential chiefs of staff (Philippines)
Kabalikat ng Malayang Pilipino politicians
Bicolano people
Lakas–CMD politicians
Lakas–CMD (1991) politicians
Liberal Party (Philippines) politicians
Arroyo administration cabinet members
Asian Institute of Management alumni